An animated series is a set of animated works with a common series title, usually related to one another. These episodes should typically share the same main characters, some different secondary characters and a basic theme. Series can have either a finite number of episodes like a miniseries, a definite end, or be open-ended, without a predetermined number of episodes. They can be broadcast on television, shown in movie theatres, released direct-to-video or on the internet. Like other television series, films, including animated films, animated series can be of a wide variety of genres and can also have different demographic target audiences, from males to females ranging children to adults.

Television

Animated television series are regularly presented and can appear as much as up to once a week or daily during a prescribed time slot. The time slot may vary including morning, like saturday-morning cartoons, prime time, like prime time cartoons, to late night, like late night anime. They may also be broadcast on weekdays (weekday cartoons) or only on weekends.

The duration of each episode varies depending on the series. Traditionally, series are produced as complete half-hour or nearly half-hour programs; however, many are produced as animated shorts of 10–11 minutes, which can also be paired with other shorts to fill a set time period. If pairing between two or more shorts is done, then said shorts may be called "segments". If on television 15-20 minutes based on commercial time. A full half hour would cut into advertisement time frames. Note that Netflix and other streaming companies that don't show commercials may require a full 30 minute cartoon the length depends on the company that airs the cartoon. There are also some short series with a length of approximately five minutes; these have recently become more common in Japanese animation.

They are sometimes grouped together according to network programming demands. Thus a particular series may appear in a number of formats or time blocks.

Animated television series had historically been used for comedy, like the cartoons, a piece of art, usually developed for humorous intent, and so, called cartoon series. However, more recently animated television series have fallen into other genres, such as action / adventure series like Speed Racer and G.I. Joe.

The first animated television series was Crusader Rabbit.

Animated sitcoms first appeared in the 1960s, with The Flintstones (1960–1966), followed by The Jetsons (1962–1987).

From 1972 to 1974, Hanna-Barbera produced Wait Till Your Father Gets Home, an adult-oriented Animated sitcom in the style of All in the Family.

Broadcast network
The 1980s and 1990s was a renaissance of the animation children's television series and adult's television series. Various broadcast networks and media companies began creating television channels and formats designed specifically for airing cartoon and anime series. Companies that already had these types of formats in place began to revamp their existing models during this time. Most of the animations were American based or Japanese Anime. Examples of current networks are:

During the 1990s, more mature content than those of traditional cartoon series began to appear more widely, extending beyond a primary audience of children. These cartoon series included The Simpsons, The Ren & Stimpy Show, Rocko's Modern Life, Beavis and Butt-Head, King of the Hill, Duckman, South Park and Family Guy. Canadian computer-animated series ReBoot, which began as a child-friendly show, shifted its target age group to ages 12 and up, resulting in a darker and more mature storyline.

Classification
 Completely original
 TV animation: Mobile Suit Gundam, Neon Genesis Evangelion, Tenchi Muyo!, ...
 Web animation

Theatrical

Animated series shown in movie theatres include the Tom and Jerry animated cartoon short films that appeared in movie theaters from 1940 to 1967.

Video

Direct-to-video animated series include most Japanese original video animations (OVAs). The first OVA series (and also the first overall OVA) was Dallos (1983). Almost all hentai (pornographic) anime series are released as OVAs.

Web series
Animated web series are animated series designed and produced for streaming services and called "web series". 
Examples include Happy Tree Friends from 1999 and Eddsworld in 2004.

They can also be released on YouTube, such as Asdfmovie, which debuted in 2008.

References

Animated series
Television genres